Michael Goldfarb (born 20 September 1950, in New York City) is an American author, journalist and broadcaster based in London since 1985. In the United States he is best known for his work for National Public Radio from 1990 to 2005.

Early life and career
Michael Goldfarb was born in New York City and grew up in suburban Philadelphia.  Upon graduating from Antioch College, he returned to New York to work as an actor. Under the name Michael Govan he appeared in productions at Long Wharf Theatre and Arena Stage. In 1984-85 he was a founding member of the Pearl Theatre Company in Manhattan.

Journalism
In November 1985, Goldfarb moved to London to pursue a career in journalism. He has reported from 25 countries on five continents.

He reported on the arts for British and American newspapers, particularly The Guardian and Newsday. He became a critic for BBC Radio 4 and this work led him into broadcast journalism with National Public Radio (NPR).

From 1990 to 1998, Goldfarb worked for NPR and from 1996 to 1998 he was its London Bureau Chief. He covered British politics, the Royal Family and the five-year-long peace process in Northern Ireland. He also reported from Bosnia and Iraq. Throughout this period he worked with the BBC and in 1994 won British radio's highest honor, the Sony Award, for his essays on the American Midwest, titled Homeward Bound.

In 1999 he was a fellow at the Joan Shorenstein Center on the Press, Politics and Public Policy at Harvard University's Kennedy School of Government.

In 2000 he joined the Boston NPR affiliate WBUR, as Senior Correspondent for the documentary series "Inside Out".  Goldfarb's programs won numerous awards including the DuPont-Columbia award for Surviving Torture: Inside Out; the RTNDA Edward R. Murrow Award for Ahmad's War: Inside Out; and the Overseas Press Club's Lowell Thomas Award for British Jihad: Inside Out. However, in 2005 he was suddenly made redundant and forced to return to freelance work. 

In 2016, he launched the FRDH podcast. He frames his storytelling through the idea that journalism is the First Rough Draft of History and draws on the history he has reported and lived and written about.

He continues to make documentaries for BBC Radio 3, Radio 4, the World Service and Radio 5 and is a regular panelist on the BBC News programme Dateline London.  He writes op-eds for The New York Times and contributes occasionally to The Guardian.

Books
While covering the Iraq War as an unembedded reporter in Iraqi Kurdistan, Goldfarb worked closely with the Iraqi newspaper editor Ahmad Shawkat. Following Shawkat's assassination in October 2003, Goldfarb wrote the story of his friend's life, which was published in 2005. Ahmad's War, Ahmad's Peace: Surviving Under Saddam, Dying in the New Iraq was named a New York Times Notable Book of 2005.

In 2009, Goldfarb published his next book: Emancipation: How Liberating Europe's Jews From the Ghetto Led to Revolution and Renaissance. It is a popular history of how Jews and European society were changed by the opening of the ghettos during the era of Jewish emancipation, which began during the French Revolution.

Works 
Ahmad's War, Ahmad's Peace: Surviving Under Saddam, Dying in the New Iraq New York: Carroll & Graf, 2006. , 
Emancipation: How Liberating Europe's Jews From the Ghetto Led to Revolution and Renaissance New York: Simon & Schuster, 2009. ,

References

External links
 FRDH Podcast website
 The Jewish Chronicle 27 May 2009: Interview with Michael Goldfarb Relinked 2021-11-02
 New York Times, Jan. 18, 2018: Clubbable, but in the Worst Way Retrieved 2018-15-05
 BBC Radio 4 Archive, Sat 24 Mar 2018: The King and Kennedy Assassinations: If the Dead Could Speak Relinked 2021-11-02

1950 births
American male journalists
Antioch College alumni
Jewish American writers
Harvard Kennedy School people
Living people
Journalists from New York City
21st-century American Jews